Hans Christian Svane Hansen (8 November 1906 – 19 February 1960), often known as H. C. Hansen or simply H. C.,  was a Danish politician who served as Prime Minister of Denmark from 1955 until his death in 1960.
A Social Democrat, Hansen served as finance minister in the unity cabinet from May to November 1945 and again from 1947 to 1950 under Hans Hedtoft. He served as minister of industry, commerce and seafare in the final month of Hedtoft's first cabinet, and later became foreign minister in 1953, and continued in this post during his own premiership until 1958. He was elected leader of his party following the death of Hedtoft.

He was the son of Christian Hansen (1875–1944) and Helene Helene Margrethe Sperling (1876–1933).
He attended Samsøgades School until 7th grade. He continued his education as a typist apprentice.
He was a secretary and later chairman in the Social Democratic Youth and became a member of parliament in 1936.

Political career
As Foreign Minister, H. C. Hansen was seen as the natural successor as Prime Minister and leader of the Social Democrats, when his friend Hans Hedtoft died of a heart attack on 29 January 1955. In addition to becoming Prime Minister, H. C. Hansen also retained the post as Foreign Minister until 1958. Among the laws passed by this government included the universal people's pension and the enactment of agricultural price supports. The law on assistance to single mothers of April 1955 introduced special assistance for widows with children and certain other categories of single women, while under the Accident Insurance Act of 1959, an independent board of appeal was set up, waiting times were reduced, compensation for survivors was converted from lump sums into running benefits, and the scheme extended to cover occupational diseases. Under a law on relations between trade union a and employers’ associations, passed in April 1956, as an offshoot of collective agreement on the labour market, a new scheme provided sickness cash benefits significantly higher than in the existing health insurance scheme. The new scheme only covered members of trade unions and those employed by members of the Danish Employers’ Association. In addition, under the Apprenticeship Act of September 1956, theoretical training was introduced at technical schools as part of apprenticeship training. In 1956, universal pension coverage in Denmark was introduced, while the Survivors’ Pension Act of March 1959 introduced a general survivors’ pension scheme, including specific provisions for single women having reached age 60. In 1959, a law was enacted that led to the establishment of the Mental Retardation Service and a decentralised regional system of services for those with intellectual disabilities. That same year, an extension of covered occupational diseases in work injury compensation was carried out. In 1958, an education reform was enacted that reduced educational barriers.

In March 1957 it had been 4 years since the last election to the Folketing, and as mandated by the Danish constitution new elections were held. After the election H. C. Hansen was able to partner with the Danish Social Liberal Party (Radikale Venstre) and Justice Party of Denmark (Retsforbundet) to form the Cabinet of H.C. Hansen II, also known as the Triangle Cabinet (Trekantsregeringen).
 
On 25 March 1957 France, West Germany, Italy, Belgium, the Netherlands and Luxembourg signed the Treaty of Rome to create the European Economic Community. To not be left behind the Danish government first wanted to join a Nordic free trade organization, but that failed and Denmark joined the European Free Trade Association (EFTA) on 3 May 1960 instead. Unlike his successors as Social Democratic leaders and prime minister, Hansen did not support Denmark joining the European Economic Community that eventually took place in 1972.

H. C. Hansen died from cancer on 19 February 1960, and was succeeded by Viggo Kampmann in the Social Democratic party and as Prime Minister. He was the second Danish prime minister in a row to die while in office.

References

Other sources
 
 Kristian Hvidt (1995)  Statsministre i Danmark fra 1913 til 1995  (Nyt nordisk forlag A. Busck)  
 Donald F. Busky (2000) Democratic Socialism:  A Global Survey  (Praeger) 
 Peter Flora (1988) Growth to Limits: The Western European Welfare States Since World War II, Volume 4  (Walter de Gruyter, Inc.)

External links
Christian Albrekt Larsen. (2013). The Rise and Fall of Social Cohesion: The Construction and De-construction of Social Trust in the US, UK, Sweden and Denmark. OUP Oxford. 
Heather Keith and Kenneth D. Keith. (2013). Intellectual Disability: Ethics, Dehumanization, and a New Moral Community, Wiley, . p.154
Peter Flora. (1986). Growth to Limits: The Western European Welfare States Since World War II, De Gruyter v. 1, pp. 200, 302
 Educational Research and Innovation Improving Health and Social Cohesion through Education, (2010). OECD Publishing, 978-92-64-08631-9, p. 40

1906 births
1960 deaths
Danish Finance Ministers
Foreign ministers of Denmark
Prime Ministers of Denmark
Members of the Folketing
Deaths from cancer in Denmark
People from Aarhus
Social Democrats (Denmark) politicians
Burials at Vestre Cemetery, Copenhagen
20th-century Danish politicians
Danish anti-communists
Bodil Honorary Award recipients
Leaders of the Social Democrats (Denmark)